Mind Fields is a book featuring paintings by Polish painter Jacek Yerka combined with short stories and prose poems by American writer Harlan Ellison. The 34 paintings by Yerka were created first. Ellison then wrote a short story based on a single painting.  The exception was "Under the Landscape" which was based on two separate paintings.

Contents
The Creation of Water
Twilight in the Cupboard
Amok Harvest
Theory of Tension
Back to Nature
Internal Inspection
Metropolis II
In the Oligocenskie Gardens
Europe
Fever
Attack at Dawn
Susan
Between Heaven and Hell
Shed of Rebellion
To Each His Own
Eruption
The Inquisition
Beneath the Dunes
The Silence
Darkness Falls on the River
Paradise
Express Delivery
The Agitators
Truancy at the Pond
Ammonite
Base
Foraging in the Field
Traffic Prohibited
Afternoon with the Bros. Grimm
The Cosmic Barnyard
Under the Landscape (two paintings)
Ellison Wonderland
Please Don't Slam the Door

Paintings
The paintings in Mind Fields are typical of Yerka's style. According to Yerka, many of the paintings, including "Between Heaven and Hell" and "Attack at Dawn", draw on his childhood memories from the 1950s as their primary inspiration. Other paintings, such as  "Amok Harvest" and "Express Delivery", draw on his experiences traveling through the Polish countryside.

Yerka was responsible for the title of all but two of the story-paintings, which were named by Ellison. The first of these, "Susan", was named after Ellison's wife. Ellison also named the painting "Ellison Wonderland" after one of his short story collections and his home in California because he "was hoping that they would give [him] that painting." The painting was later given to Ellison as a gift shortly after the book was published during an interview with Tom Snyder on The Late Late Show.

Stories
Ellison became involved with Yerka's paintings when he was asked to write an introduction to the Mind Fields collection. According to Ellison, he found the paintings so inspiring that he told his publishers that he wanted to write a story for each one. While Ellison generally based the narrative of each story on some aspect of the painting, this was not always the case. In "Attack at Dawn" for instance, the story has little to do with the physical objects represented in Yerka's painting. Instead, Ellison chose to base the story on the painting's prominent themes of transformation and attack.

Ellison also wrote many of the stories to reflect subjects and themes that commonly occur in his work. "Twilight in the Cupboard" and "The Silence" both prominently feature the themes of Jewish assimilation and the Holocaust. The former was inspired in part by Ather D. Morse's 1967 book While Six Million Died. "Eruption" and "Ammonite" embody the lost city/Atlantis theme present in much of Ellison's work. "Metropolis II" also incorporates themes from many of Ellison's other stories. In particular, it mixes autobiographical details with fiction in a manner similar to "All the Lies that are My Life" and other stories.

Although Ellison did not follow his usual custom of writing an introduction to the book, he did provide commentary on 17 of the stories in the form of endnotes. These notes describe the background to some of the stories, and point out important themes. Yerka's son Philip died during the creation of the book, and Ellison dedicated the final story "Please Don't Slam the Door" to his memory in one of the notes.

References

Footnotes

1994 short story collections
Short story collections by Harlan Ellison
Surrealist works